Lawrence Francis O'Donnell Jr. (born November 7, 1951) is an American television anchor, actor, author, screenwriter, liberal political commentator, and host of The Last Word with Lawrence O'Donnell, an MSNBC opinion and news program that airs on weeknights.

He was a writer and producer for the NBC series The West Wing (playing the role of President Bartlet's father in flashbacks) as well as creator and executive producer of the NBC series Mister Sterling. He also appeared as a recurring character on the HBO series Big Love.

O'Donnell began his political career as an aide to U.S. Senator Daniel Patrick Moynihan and was staff director for the Senate Finance Committee. He describes himself as a "practical European socialist".

Early life
O'Donnell was born in Boston on November 7, 1951, the son of Frances Marie (née Buckley), an office manager, and Lawrence Francis O'Donnell Sr., an attorney. He is of Irish descent and grew up Catholic. He attended St. Sebastian's School (class of 1970), where he was captain of the baseball team and wide receiver on their undefeated football team. O'Donnell majored in economics at Harvard College, from which he graduated in 1976. While at Harvard, he wrote for the Harvard Lampoon.

Career

Author
From 1977 to 1988, O'Donnell was a writer. In 1983, he published the book Deadly Force, about a case of wrongful death and police brutality in which O'Donnell's father was the plaintiff's lawyer. In 1986, the book was made into the film A Case of Deadly Force, in which Richard Crenna played O'Donnell's father and Tate Donovan played O'Donnell, and for which O'Donnell was associate producer. In 2017, O'Donnell published the book Playing with Fire: The 1968 Election and the Transformation of American Politics.

U.S. Congress
From 1989 to 1995, O'Donnell was a legislative aide to Senator Daniel Patrick Moynihan. From 1989 to 1991, he served as senior advisor to Moynihan. From 1992 to 1993, he was staff director of the United States Senate Committee on Environment and Public Works, then chaired by Senator Moynihan, and from 1993 to 1995 he was staff director of the United States Senate Committee on Finance, again under Senator Moynihan's chairmanship.

Television

Writing and production
From 1999 to 2006, O'Donnell was associated with the television drama The West Wing. During that time, he wrote 16 episodes. From 1999 to 2000, he was executive story editor for 12 episodes; in 2000, he was co-producer of five episodes; from 2000 to 2001, he was producer of 17 episodes; from 2003 to 2005, he was consulting producer for 44 episodes; and, from 2005 to 2006, he was executive producer for 22 episodes. O'Donnell won the 2001 Primetime Emmy Award for Outstanding Drama Series for The West Wing and was nominated for the 2006 Emmy for the same category.

In 2002, O'Donnell was supervising producer and writer for the television drama First Monday; and, in 2003, he was creator, executive producer, and writer for the television drama Mister Sterling.

Contributor and host

In 2009, O'Donnell became a regular contributor on Morning Joe with Joe Scarborough. His aggressive debate style on that program and others led to several on-air confrontations, including an interview with conservative Marc Thiessen on Morning Joe that became so heated that Scarborough took O'Donnell off the air. Also in 2009 and 2010, O'Donnell began appearing frequently as a substitute host of Countdown with Keith Olbermann, particularly when Olbermann's father was ill in the hospital.

On September 27, 2010, O'Donnell began hosting a 10p.m. show on MSNBC, called The Last Word with Lawrence O'Donnell. On January 21, 2011, it was announced that O'Donnell would take over the 8p.m. slot from Keith Olbermann after Olbermann announced the abrupt termination of his show, Countdown with Keith Olbermann. Beginning October 24, 2011, The Last Word with Lawrence O'Donnell switched time slots with The Ed Show, with Ed Schultz taking over the 8p.m. Eastern slot, and O'Donnell returning to the 10p.m. Eastern slot.

Acting
O'Donnell played Lee Hatcher, the Henrickson family attorney, in the HBO series Big Love, about a polygamous family in Utah. In addition to being a producer on The West Wing, O'Donnell also played President Josiah Bartlet's father in a flashback sequence of the episode "Two Cathedrals". O'Donnell portrayed Judge Lawrence Barr in two episodes of Monk and played himself on an episode of Showtime's Homeland.

Controversies
[[File:Lawrence O'Donnell.jpg|thumb|O'Donnell at the 2009 premiere of PoliWood]]

In 2007, O'Donnell criticized Mitt Romney's speech on religion, stating: "Romney comes from a religion that was founded by a criminal who was anti-American, pro-slavery, and a rapist." In the April 3, 2012, broadcast of The Last Word, O'Donnell made comments regarding the Church of Jesus Christ of Latter-day Saints (LDS Church), saying it was an "invented religion," which was "created by a guy in upstate New York in 1830 when he got caught having sex with the maid and explained to his wife that God told him to do it." During the April 11, 2012, broadcast of The Last Word, O'Donnell apologized for the April3 comments, stating that they offended many, including some of the show's most supportive fans.

Before showing a taped October 2010 interview with RNC Chairman Michael Steele, O'Donnell caused controversy over his intro to the interview which was considered racially insensitive. He said, "Michael Steele is dancing as fast as he can, trying to charm independent voters and Tea Partiers while never losing sight of his real master and paycheck provider, the Republican National Committee." After drawing criticism from Steele and talk-radio host Larry Elder, O'Donnell apologized for his remarks.

O'Donnell also drew criticism for an October 2010 interview with Congressman Ron Paul, when Paul accused him of breaking an agreement not to ask him about other political candidates. O'Donnell said he was not part of any agreement; but an MSNBC spokeswoman stated, "We told Representative Paul's office that the focus would be on the tea party movement, not on specific candidates."

During an October 2011 interview, O'Donnell accused Republican primary candidate Herman Cain of not participating in protests during the Civil Rights Movement of the 1960s and also charged him with avoiding the draft during the Vietnam War. The Atlantic's Conor Friedersdorf said the questions posed by O'Donnell were "offensive" and declared, "In this interview, O'Donnell goes to absurd lengths to use patriotism and jingoism as cudgels to attack his conservative guest, almost as if he is doing a Stephen Colbert style parody of the tactics he imagines a right-wing blowhard might employ. Does he realize he's becoming what he claims to abhor?" O'Donnell's interview with Cain was later defended by Reverend Al Sharpton.

On September 20, 2017, an eight-minute video clip was leaked which showed O'Donnell angrily cursing and swearing about background noise between segments of a live broadcast that had aired August 29, 2017. O'Donnell apologized on Twitter, and the leaker was subsequently fired.

On August 27, 2019, O'Donnell reported that Deutsche Bank documents showed Russian oligarchs had cosigned loan applications for Trump. O'Donnell reported the story, based on a single source he did not identify, using the qualifier "if true" and admitted it had not been verified by NBC News. The next day, O'Donnell walked back the report, referring to it as an "error in judgment."

Political views
In a 2005 interview, O'Donnell called himself a "practical European socialist". O'Donnell also declared himself a "socialist" on the November 6, 2010, Morning Joe show, stating: "I am not a progressive. I am not a liberal who is so afraid of the word that I had to change my name to 'progressive'. Liberals amuse me. I am a socialist. I live to the extreme left, the extreme left of you mere liberals." On the August 1, 2011, episode of The Last Word, O'Donnell further explained: "I have been calling myself a socialist ever since I first read the definition of socialism in the first economics class I took in college".

Philanthropy
In late 2010, O'Donnell made a trip to Malawi with the intent of providing school-room desks for students who had never seen desks. MSNBC and UNICEF partnered to create the K.I.N.D. fund—Kids in Need of Desks—with the mission to deliver desks to African schools. As of December 2013, the program had raised over $6.5 million, paying for approximately 100,000 desks to be delivered to classrooms. In addition, the K.I.N.D. fund also provides scholarships to help young girls in Malawi attend school. By the end of 2017 the Fund had raised $19 million.

Personal life
On February 14, 1994, Lawrence O'Donnell married Kathryn Harrold. The couple has one child, Elizabeth Buckley Harrold O'Donnell. O'Donnell and Harrold divorced in 2013.

In April 2014, he and his brother Michael were injured in a traffic accident while vacationing in the British Virgin Islands. O'Donnell returned to his MSNBC show The Last Word'' in June after two months of recuperation.

He was awarded the Honorary degree of Doctor of Humane Letters (DHL) by Suffolk University in 2001.

Filmography

Film

Television

See also
 New Yorkers in journalism

References

External links

 
 
 The Last Word with Lawrence O'Donnell on MSNBC
 

1951 births
20th-century American male actors
20th-century American male writers
20th-century American screenwriters
21st-century American male actors
21st-century American male writers
21st-century American screenwriters
American Catholics
American democratic socialists
American male television actors
American male television writers
American people of Irish descent
American political journalists
American social democrats
American television talk show hosts
American television writers
Critics of Mormonism
Employees of the United States Senate
Harvard College alumni
Living people
MSNBC people
Male actors from Boston
Massachusetts socialists
Primetime Emmy Award winners
Screenwriters from Massachusetts
Television producers from Massachusetts
The Harvard Lampoon alumni
United States congressional aides
Writers from Boston